Ompora, locally known as "Wompur", is a municipality area of district Budgam. It is one of the highly populated area of Budgam municipality in  district Budgam.

See also
 Budgam
 Ichgam
 Kashmir

References

Villages in Budgam district